Cargo is a 2006 thriller film. It was directed by Clive Gordon, produced by Andrea Calderwood and Juan Gordon, and written by Paul Laverty.  The film features the actors Peter Mullan, Daniel Brühl, Luis Tosar, Samuli Edelmann and Gary Lewis.

Plot

Cargo tells the tale of a young man who has gotten into trouble in Africa and because of this he decides to stow away on a cargo ship leaving for Europe.  During this voyage, sailors on the ship began to disappear with no apparent reason and the ship's depraved captain seems to have the answers.

References

External links
 

2006 films
2006 crime thriller films
2006 psychological thriller films
Seafaring films
Films scored by Stephen Warbeck